Rolf Blau (born 21 May 1952) is a German former professional footballer who played as a midfielder.

References

External links
 

1952 births
Living people
German footballers
Association football midfielders
Germany B international footballers
Bundesliga players
2. Bundesliga players
Hannover 96 players
SC Preußen Münster players
FC St. Pauli players
VfL Bochum players
Hertha BSC players